The LEN Cup 2008–09 was the 17th edition of this water polo competition, and was won by Szeged Beton VSE. It was the first time a Hungarian club won the competition since Újpesti TE's 3rd title in 1999.

1st Qualification Round

Group A (Istanbul)

Group B (Budapest)

Group C (Budapest)

Group D (Vouliagmeni)

Group E (Prčanj)

Group F (Kotor)

Group G (Szeged)

Group H (Chios)

2nd Qualification Round

Group I (Oradea)

Group J (Montpellier)

Group K (Budapest)

Group L (Barcelona)

Group M (Vouliagmeni)

Group N (Novi Sad)

Group O (Novi Sad)

Group P (Rijeka)

Eight finals

Quarter finals

Semifinals

Final

References
  Ligue Européenne de Natation

2008 in water polo
2009 in water polo
2008
Euro Cup
Sports competitions in Athens